The women's 1500 metres event  at the 1995 IAAF World Indoor Championships was held on 12 March.

Doping disqualifications
Lyubov Kremlyova of Russia, who originally finished third, and Violeta Beclea (ROU), who originally finished fourth, were both disqualified for doping.

The bronze medal was awarded to Maite Zúñiga of Spain.

Results

References

1500
1500 metres at the World Athletics Indoor Championships
1995 in women's athletics